is a comic strip that first appeared in the February 1998 issue of The Alien (later known as Japanzine), a monthly magazine for expatriates in Japan.

Larry Rodney created the strip and wrote the first eleven installments, which were illustrated by Glen Schroeder. In January 1998, after Rodney left Japan, Neil Garscadden assumed writing responsibilities while Wayne Wilson illustrated. From 2002, Garscadden handed it to another writer, Wayne Wilson. The strip was discontinued in 2006, but in 2009, Rodney and Garscadden announced plans to team up and compile a book of previous strips with new installments.

The strip has been discussed in mainstream English language daily newspapers in Japan, and a compendium of Charisma Man's exploits is available both in major Japanese bookshops and online.

Concept 
"Charisma Man" manipulates the superhero genre to ridicule the often unjustified self–confidence of some foreign men in Japan. Although something of a loser in his home country Canada—the home of Charisma Man's creator—when around Japanese people the central character transforms from a skinny nerd into a muscle-bound hunk, extremely attractive to women and admired by men. Like other superheroes, however, Charisma Man has one major weakness: "Western Woman". Whenever in the presence of western females his powers disappear and he becomes an unattractive, skinny wimp once more.

"Charisma Man" is thus a statement on the relationships between Japanese and non-Japanese in Japan. According to Rodney:

Although "Charisma Man" does poke fun at the exotic food, weird English, popularity of kawaii icons such as "Hello Kitty" and many other aspects of life in Japan that foreign residents find strange, the strip mostly ridicules the stereotypes formed by western men about the Japanese, despite Rodney's references to the "filter" through which Japanese view westerners.

Charisma Man's girlfriends, colleagues and employers are depicted as constantly amazed by Charisma Man's "powers": his Japanese language skills, his ability to drink copious amounts of alcohol and his amazing popularity. Japanese women appear as uniformly attractive, constantly complimentary and, to Charisma Man, easily obtainable. Western women in Japan, meanwhile, are depicted as sour and, in work settings, coldly professional.

From time to time the strip's authors express awareness of the superficiality of such western stereotypes about Japan, by attributing minor Japanese characters the same "powers" as Charisma Man. In one strip, for example, Charisma Man's girlfriend is depicted as tall and incredibly attractive when no Western woman is present. After Charisma Man's mother arrives for a visit, however, she is depicted as short and somewhat plump.

After Garscadden left The Alien/Japanzine in 2003, Carter Witt took over writing chores through 2004, when writer and story-boarder Wayne Wilson (same name as illustrator, different person) continued the strip until its final run in 2005.

Stylistic changes
Garscadden injected even more fantasy into certain episodes. Charisma Man imagined himself as an astronaut, a pilot, a doctor or a psychologist in order to ridicule some aspect of expatriate life. Usually the last panel of the strip cut away to "reality", where the "geek" version of the character engaged in mundane activity (usually teaching English) that he had elevated in his dream to a more noble pursuit. Unlike Rodney, Garscadden often displayed Charisma Man in his "geek" incarnation alongside doting Japanese in the last panel.

In later strips Japanese female characters are depicted as openly ridiculing the protagonist without his knowledge. The stories in the strip are thus mainly told from a western Japanese perspective and mostly poke fun at common ideas westerners in Japan often hold about their own superiority vis-a-vis the Japanese.

See also
 Gaijin
 Ethnocentrism
 Asian fetish

References

Further reading

External links
 
 

Japanese comic strips
Racism in Japan